Paul Andrew (born 14 February 1989, in Truro, England) is a British rugby union player who played for Cornish Pirates in the RFU Championship. At 6 feet tall and weighing 17 stone, Andrew plays as a prop.

Andrew first joined the Cornish Pirates in 2008, and later moved to the Worcester Warriors in 2013.

In 2014, Andrew was re-signed to the Cornish Pirates on a two-year contract.

He made his league debut for the Pirates when he was nineteen years of age and went on to represent Cornwall, Cornwall U20 and England Conference U18.

References

https://web.archive.org/web/20140517184636/http://www.warriors.co.uk/warriors/matchcentre/players_warriors_first_team.php?player=81551&includeref=dynamic
https://web.archive.org/web/20150708113753/http://www.cornish-pirates.com/15-16_player_profiles/paul_andrew.html
https://archive.today/20130724092422/http://cornish-pirates.com/archive/12-13_news/paul_andrew_signs_for_worcester_warriors.html

1989 births
Living people
Worcester Warriors players